Canadian musician Daniel Caesar has released two studio albums and one studio EP, among many singles including "Get You" featuring Kali Uchis and "Best Part" featuring H.E.R. As a featured artists, his most notable appearance is on the Justin Bieber RIAA 3-times platinum single "Peaches". He often collaborates with other Toronto-based artists like BadBadNotGood, Charlotte Day Wilson, River Tiber, and Sean Leon.

Albums

Extended plays

Singles

As lead artist 

Notes

As featured artist

Other charted and certified songs

Guest appearances

Songwriting credits

References 

Discographies of Canadian artists
Contemporary R&B discographies